Jérôme Schneider (born 4 November 1981) is a former Swiss footballer.

External links
 Jérôme Schneider profile at football.ch
 

1981 births
People from Neuchâtel
Living people
Swiss men's footballers
Association football defenders
Neuchâtel Xamax FCS players
SR Delémont players
FC La Chaux-de-Fonds players
Servette FC players
Swiss Super League players
Swiss Challenge League players
Swiss Promotion League players
Swiss 1. Liga (football) players
2. Liga Interregional players
Sportspeople from the canton of Neuchâtel